Hurşit is a masculine given name derived from Persian Khorshid. It may refer to:

 Hurshid Pasha (died 1822), Ottoman general and Grand Vizier
 Hurşit Atak (born 1991), Turkish weightlifter 
 Hurşit Güneş (born 1957), Turkish economist and politician 
 Hurşit Tolon (born 1942), retired Turkish general
 Ziya Hurşit (1892–1926), Turkish politician

Hurşut
 Hurşut Meriç (born 1983), Dutch professional footballer of Turkish descent

Turkish masculine given names